Log Čezsoški is a small settlement on left bank of the Soča River in the Municipality of Bovec in the Littoral region of Slovenia.

References

External links
Log Čezsoški at Geopedia

Populated places in the Municipality of Bovec